Aniyan Midhun, popularly known as "Son of the Arabian Sea" (born 18 June 1992), is an Indian Wushu practitioner. He holds the World record for being the first South Indian to represent India in International Wushu fighting and win Gold. He won the gold medal at the World Pro Wushu Sanda Fight 2022 held in Thailand in December, 2022. He was awarded the World's Best fighter by the Government of Nepal for his exemplary performance. He is currently the World Record Holder for the fastest knockout after his match win against Pakistan in 2021. He also won the gold medal in the South Asian Wushu Championship 2021, in the 70 kg category. He won the Human Rights Nobel Award presented by the Global Human Rights Trust in 2022 in recognition of exceptional services, performance of the highest order, without distinction of caste, colour, creed, religion and sex. Midhun was part of the ten-member squad who represented India in the South Asian Wushu Championship, held on 30 & 31 March 2021 in Nepal. He is the first South Indian to represent India in Wushu.

Career 
Midhun's martial arts journey started out from his native, Thrissur, Kerala, when he was in 5th standard, with Karate coaching. He started his career in Karate and moved onto kickboxing and then to Wushu while he was a 7th standard student. He has immense love for the sea and he spent most of his childhood on the beach. He trained and practised on the beach which in the long run prepared him better for professional fights. He prides himself in being called the "Son of the Arabian Sea".

He holds a black belt in Karate. He is a player for several prominent associations like the Kerala State Sports Council, Sports Authority of India, J&K State Sports Council and J&K Wushu Association. Midhun has been a state Wushu practitioner for Kerala and is a national champion in kickboxing (Indian Association of Kick-boxing, 2015). He is also a pro fighter in KAKO (Keranadu Association of Kick-boxing Organizations). Currently, Midhun is being trained by Dhronacharya Award winner and the Indian Wushu Head Coach Kuldeep Handoo.

Aniyan Midhun is also a martial arts/fitness trainer to several celebrities, including Shafna, Roshan Basheer, Prayaga Martin, and Amith Chakalakkal. Apart from these celebrities, he trains about 70 students in his hometown.

References 

1992 births
Living people
Martial artists from Kerala
Indian wushu practitioners
Sportspeople from Thrissur
Wushu practitioners in India